Howard Francis Baker (March 1, 1888 – January 16, 1964) was a Major League Baseball third baseman who played for three seasons.

External links

1888 births
1964 deaths
Baseball players from Connecticut
Major League Baseball third basemen
Cleveland Naps players
Chicago White Sox players
New York Giants (NL) players
Minor league baseball managers
Portland Beavers players
Waterbury Contenders players
Evansville River Rats players
Little Rock Travelers players
Bridgeport Hustlers players
New Orleans Pelicans (baseball) players
Nashville Vols players
Bridgeport Americans players
Sportspeople from Bridgeport, Connecticut